Rangpuri (Rangpuri: অংপুরি Ôṅgpuri or অমপুরি Ômpuri) is an eastern Indo-Aryan language of the Bengali-Assamese branch, spoken in northern West Bengal, western Goalpara of Assam in India and Rangpur Division in Bangladesh.  Many are bilingual in Bengali and Assamese in their respective regions. According to Glottolog, it forms the Central-Eastern Kamta group with the Kamta language.  Together with Rajbanshi and Surjapuri they form the Kamta group of languages.

Names
Rangpuri goes by numerous names, the most common being Bahe; though Deshi bhasha and Anchalit bhasha is also used.

Comparison with related languages

Notes

References

External links

 Rangpuri at Omniglot
 Ethnologue Report on Rangpuri

Eastern Indo-Aryan languages
Languages of Bangladesh
Languages of West Bengal
Bengali dialects